Ma Dong-seok (born Lee Dong-seok on March 1, 1971), also known as Don Lee, is a South Korean and American actor. With his breakout performance in Train to Busan and subsequent leading roles, he has become one of South Korea's most successful actors. He was Gallup Korea's Film Actor of the Year in 2018.

Early life
Ma was born on March 1, 1971. He has American citizenship. He lived in Ohio and attended Columbus State before returning to South Korea to pursue his acting career.

Career
Ma rose to fame for his supporting roles in the films The Neighbor, Nameless Gangster: Rules of the Time, and The Unjust. He then played leading roles in Norigae, Murderer, and One on One.

Ma's role in the zombie film Train to Busan propelled him to international popularity. His subsequent leading roles in films Derailed, The Bros, The Outlaws, Unstoppable, Champion, The Gangster, the Cop, the Devil, The Bad Guys: Reign of Chaos and The Roundup along with supporting roles in Along with the Gods: The Last 49 Days and Ashfall have met with critical and commercial successes led him to Most Bankable Star of Korean Cinema. Although known for his 'tough guy' persona roles, Ma is often celebrated and criticized for playing similar roles in his movies. In 2019, he joined the cast of the MCU film Eternals as Gilgamesh which marked his Hollywood debut. 

On television, Ma is known for his roles in the hit OCN series Bad Guys and Squad 38.

In 2022, Ma signed a contract with LDH Japan, another large Japanese agency. His 2022 release action crime thriller The Roundup, sequel to his 2017 film The Outlaws not only opened to unanimous positive reviews but also became the highest grossing film of 2022 by surpassing 12 million admissions for the first time since 2019 and all time 3rd highest grosser in South Korea.

Other activities

Under his Westernized name, Don Lee, and before he turned to acting, Ma was the personal trainer of mixed martial artists Mark Coleman and Kevin Randleman.

With his production company Team Gorilla, Ma is currently involved in planning and writing screenplays. He worked on the screenplay for the film Deep Trap, in which he starred. He is also the co-creator of the OCN Dramatic Cinema series Team Bulldog: Off-Duty Investigation''.

Armwrestling

Ma has been an amateur armwrestler since 2008, and he became the president of Korea Armwrestling Federation in 2018.

Personal life
In 2016, Ma was reportedly dating sports reporter and media personality Ye Jung-hwa. On October 20, 2022, Ma's agency stated that he and Ye has registered their marriage last year. The wedding ceremony will be held at a later date, due to COVID-19 situation and busy schedules.

Filmography

Awards and nominations

Listicles

Notes

References

External links

  Ma Dong-seok at Big Punch Ent 
 
 
 
 

1971 births
Living people
People from Seoul
Male actors from Seoul
American male film actors
American male television actors
21st-century American male actors
South Korean expatriates in the United States
American male actors of Korean descent
People with acquired American citizenship
Best Supporting Actor Paeksang Arts Award (film) winners